Planet Labs PBC (formerly Planet Labs, Inc. and Cosmogia, Inc.) is an American public Earth imaging company based in San Francisco, California. Their goal is to image the entirety of the Earth daily to monitor changes and pinpoint trends.

The company designs and manufactures Triple-CubeSat miniature satellites called Doves that are then delivered into orbit as secondary payloads on other rocket launch missions. Each Dove is equipped with a high-powered telescope and camera programmed to capture different swaths of Earth. Each Dove Earth observation satellite continuously scans Earth, sending data once it passes over a ground station, by means of a frame image sensor.

The images gathered by Doves, which can be accessed online and some of which is available under an open data access policy, provide up-to-date information relevant to climate monitoring, crop yield prediction, urban planning, and disaster response. With acquisition of BlackBridge in July 2015, Planet Labs had 87 Dove and 5 RapidEye satellites launched into orbit. In 2017, Planet launched an additional 88 Dove satellites, and Google sold its subsidiary Terra Bella and its SkySat satellite constellation to Planet Labs. By September 2018 the company had launched nearly 300 satellites, 150 of which are active. In 2020, Planet Labs launched six additional high-resolution SkySats, SkySats 16–21, and 35 Dove satellites.

Through a deal funded by Norway’s Climate and Forests Initiative (NICFI), Planet and its partners Airbus and KSAT are providing access to high-resolution basemaps of 64 tropical countries to help combat deforestation. It also provides data to FAO's Framework for Ecosystem Monitoring (Ferm).

Following a January 2021 launch of 48 Planet SuperDoves, the company operated a global constellation of over 200 active satellites.

In July 2021 Planet Labs announced that they plan to become a public company and list on the New York Stock Exchange through a merger with the SPAC DMY Technology Group Inc IV. The deal would value Planet at US$2.8B. The business combination was completed on December 7, 2021. Planet registered as a public benefit corporation and formally changed its name to Planet Labs PBC. The stock began trading on the New York Stock Exchange on December 8, 2021. After the merger, Planet had more than $500 million in capital and about 190 satellites in orbit. The company expected it to take the next few years until they get to cashflow breakeven, funding their operations with $200 million from the aforementioned $500 million (the rest $300 million forming a "strategic warchest"). At the time of the merger, the company had over 600 customers (most customers, 90%, are annual subscriptions to Planet's data service) and it generated $113 million in revenue in 2020. At the time of the merger, Planet aimed to be profitable on an adjusted EBITDA basis by early 2025, and to grow its annual revenue to nearly $700 million by early 2026.

Planet Labs has contracts to supply imagery to various agencies of the US government, including the FAS, NOAA, Oak Ridge, Sandia, the Bureau of Reclamation, and NASA.

History 

Planet Labs was founded in 2010 as Cosmogia by former NASA scientists Chris Boshuizen, Will Marshall, and Robbie Schingler. The initial goal of the company was to make use of information gathered from space to help with life on Earth. The group of scientists considered the problem with most satellites to be their large and clunky form, prompting them to build inexpensive and compact satellites to be manufactured in bulk, called CubeSats. The small group began building Planet's first satellite in a California garage.

Planet Labs launched two demonstration CubeSats, Dove 1 and Dove 2, in April 2013. Both Dove 1 (aboard Antares 110 rocket) and Dove 2 (aboard a Soyuz Rocket) were placed in a sun-synchronous orbit. Dove 3 and Dove 4 were launched in November 2013.

In June 2013, it announced plans for Flock-1, a constellation of 28 Earth-observing satellites.

The Flock-1 CubeSats were brought to the International Space Station in January 2014 and deployed via the NanoRacks CubeSat Deployer in mid-February. The company planned to launch a total of 131 satellites by mid-2015.

In January 2015, the firm raised $95 million in funding. As of May 2015, Planet Labs raised a total amount of $183 million in venture capital financing.

In July 2015, Planet Labs acquired BlackBridge and its RapidEye constellation.

On April 18, 2017, Google completed the sale of Terra Bella and its SkySat satellite constellation to Planet Labs. As part of the sale, Google acquired an equity stake in Planet and entered into a multi-year agreement to purchase SkySat imaging data.

On January 21, 2018, a Dove Pioneer CubeSat was part of the payload of a Rocket Lab Electron rocket, the first orbital-entry craft launched from a privately owned and operated spaceport at Māhia Peninsula in New Zealand.

In July 2018, Planet laid off somewhat less than ten percent of its workforce.  In September 2018, the company had launched a total of 298 satellites, 150 of which were still active.

On December 18, 2018, Planet announced they were in the process of acquiring the St Louis company, Boundless Spatial, Inc., a geospatial data software solutions company. The portfolio of Boundless will help improve data subscription services and aid in Planet's long-term goal of increasing cooperation between the company and the U.S. government.

On 3 July 2020, it was mentioned in the news that the company had "more than 120" active satellites at the time "providing daily imaging coverage over all of the world’s landmass".

In August 2020, Planet completed its SkySat Constellation of 21 satellites by launching the final three SkySats on a SpaceX Falcon 9 rocket.

In May 2022, SES Government Solutions (now SES Space & Defense), a wholly-owned subsidiary of communications satellite owner and operator, SES, in partnership with Planet Labs, was awarded a US$28.96 million contract from NASA’s Communications Services Project for real-time, always-on low-latency connectivity services to NASA spacecraft in low-Earth orbit for routine missions, contingency operations, launch and ascent, and early operations phase communications, using SES's geostationary orbiting C-band satellites and medium Earth orbiting Ka-band satellites, including the forthcoming O3b mPOWER constellation.

Flock satellite constellations  

Planet's PlanetScope satellite constellation is designed to observe Earth. By using several small satellites, CubeSats, the constellation produces three to five meters high resolution images of Earth. The flock collects images from latitudes that are within 52 degrees of Earth's equator. A large portion of the world's agricultural regions and population lie within the area imaged by the flock. Initially, the mission used the ISS (International Space Station) and different track launch vehicles to get in orbit.

Dove
Flock 1c, consisting of 11 Dove satellites, was successfully launched on 19 June 2014 with a Dnepr rocket on a record-breaking launch that carried to orbit the largest number of satellites up to that time, 37.
Flock 1b, consisting of 28 Dove satellites, was successfully launched to the ISS on 13 July 2014 with the Cygnus Orb-2 cargo mission. All of those satellites have been deployed from the ISS but 6, that have been returned to Earth with the SpaceX CRS-5 mission 212 days later.
Flock 1d, consisting of 26 Dove satellites, was supposed to be carried to the ISS with the Cygnus Orb-3 cargo mission but was lost due the Antares rocket exploding seconds after liftoff.
Flock 1d, consisting of 2 Dove satellites, was launched successfully as a replacement of the lost Flock 1d group on 10 January 2015 with the SpaceX CRS-5 cargo mission and was later deployed from the ISS on 3 March 2015.
Flock 1e, consisting of 14 Dove satellites, was successfully launched on 14 April 2015 with the SpaceX CRS-6 cargo mission and was later deployed from the ISS between the 13 and the 16 July 2015.
Flock 1f, consisting of 8 Dove satellites, was supposed to be carried to the ISS on 28 June 2015 with the SpaceX CRS-7 cargo mission but was lost due to the Falcon 9 rocket disintegrating 139 seconds into the flight.
Flock 2b, consisting of 14 Dove satellites, was successfully launched on 19 August 2015 with the HTV-5 cargo mission and all but two satellites of the group has been deployed from the ISS, starting from 15 September 2015.
Flock 2e, consisting of 12 Dove Satellites, was successfully launched on 6 December 2015 with the Cygnus OA-4 cargo mission and was deployed from the ISS between 17 May and 1 June 2016.
Flock 2e''', consisting of 20 Dove Satellites, was successfully launched on 23 March 2016 with the Cygnus OA-6 cargo mission and was deployed from the ISS between 17 May and 14 September 2016.Flock 2p, consisting of twelve Dove satellites, and Flock 3p, consisting of 88 Dove satellites, were launched from Satish Dhawan Space Centre in Sriharikota, India, by ISRO (Indian Space Research Organization) PSLV-C37 on 22 June 2016 and 15 February 2017, respectively.Flock-1 Gunther's Space Page 22 June 2016 Flock 3p was the largest satellite fleet ever launched.Flock 2k, consisting of 48 Dove satellites, launched on 14 July 2017 aboard Soyuz-2.1a.Flock 3m, consisting of 4 Dove satellites, was launched on 31 October 2017 on a Minotaur C rocket, along with six of Planet's SkySat satellites.Flock 3p,  consisting of 4 Dove satellites, was launched in India ISRO's PSLV-C40 mission on 12 January 2018.
 A single Dove satellite nicknamed Dove Pioneer was launched on 21 January 2018 onboard the first successful flight (and second overall) of Rocket Lab Electron rocket.Flock 3r, consisting of 16 Dove satellites, was successfully launched on 29 November 2018 with the PSLV-C43 mission.Flock 3s, consisting of 3 satellites, was successfully launched on 3 December 2018 aboard a SpaceX Falcon 9 rocket from Vandenberg Air Force Base in California.Flock 3k, consisting of 12 Dove satellites, was successfully launched on 27 December 2018. The flock was launched on a Soyuz Rocket from the Vostochny Cosmodrome in Russia into a sun-synchronous orbit.  Flock 4a, launched 1 April 2019, consisting of 20 SuperDoves, was the first flock including satellites with improved imaging technology. The flock was delivered to 504 km sun-synchronous orbit on ISRO's PSLV-C45 rocket.Flock 4p, consisting 12 SuperDoves with multiple spectral bands and other improvements was launched at 03:58 UTC on 27 November 2019 by PSLV C47 into a sun-synchronous orbit.Flock 4e, consisting of 5 SuperDoves was planned to be launched into a 500 km SSO orbit onboard Electron on 4 July 2020. However, due to a failure during the second stage burn, the payloads failed to reach orbit.Flock-4v, consisting of 26 SuperDoves, was successfully launched on 3 September 2020 with a Vega rocket as part of the Small Satellites Mission Service Proof of Concept (SSMS PoC) mission.Flock 4e’, consisting of 9 SuperDoves, was successfully launched on Rocket Labs Electron Rocket on 28 October 28 2020.Flock 4s, consisting of 48 SuperDoves, was successfully launched on SpaceX’s Transporter-1 mission. This record-breaking launch successfully deployed 143 satellites - the most ever on a single mission.Flock 4x, consisting of 44 SuperDoves, was successfully launched on SpaceX’s Transporter-3 mission on 13 January 2022.Flock 4y, consisting of 36 SuperDoves, was successfully launched on SpaceX's Transporter-6 mission on 3 January 2023.

 RapidEye RapidEye was a five-satellite constellation producing  resolution imagery that Planet acquired from the German company BlackBridge.

The satellites were built by Surrey Satellite Technology Ltd. (SSTL) of Guildford, subcontracted by MacDonald Dettwiler (MDA) of Richmond, Canada. They were launched on 29 August 2008 on a Dnepr rocket from Baikonur cosmodrome in Kazakhstan.

Each of RapidEye's five satellites contained identical Jena-Optronik Spaceborne Scanner JSS 56 multi-spectral pushbroom sensor imagers. They collected data in the Blue (440–510 nm), Green (520–590 nm), Red (630–690 nm), Red-Edge (690–730 nm) and Near-Infrared (760–880 nm).

The RapidEye constellation was officially retired in April 2020.

 SkySat SkySat'' is a constellation of sub-metre resolution Earth observation satellites that provide imagery, high-definition video and analytics services. Planet acquired the satellites with their purchase of Terra Bella (formerly Skybox Imaging), a Mountain View, California-based company founded in 2009 by Dan Berkenstock, Julian Mann, John Fenwick, and Ching-Yu Hu, from Google in 2017.

The SkySat satellites are based on the CubeSat concept, using inexpensive automotive grade electronics and fast commercially available processors, but scaled up to approximately the size of a minifridge.

The first SkySat satellite, SkySat-1, was launched on a Dnepr (rocket) from Yasny, Russia on 21 November 2013, and the second, SkySat-2, launched on a Soyuz-2/Fregat rocket from Baikonur, Kazakhstan on 8 July 2014. Four more SkySat units were launched on 16 September 2016, by the Vega rocket's seventh flight from Kourou, and six more SkySat satellites, along with four Dove CubeSats, were launched on a Minotaur-C rocket from Vandenberg Air Force Base on 31 October 2017.

In 2020, Planet lowered their constellation of 15 SkySats from an altitude of 500 kilometers to 450 kilometers to improve the resolution of orthorectified imagery from 80 centimeters to 50 centimeters per pixel.

On June 13, 2020, SpaceX's Falcon 9 rocket successfully launched SkySats 16, 17 and 18 along with a batch of its Starlink communications satellites.

SkySats 19, 20 and 21 were launched on August 18, 2020 on SpaceX's Falcon 9 rocket. This completed the SkySat fleet of 21 high-resolution satellites.

It has a spatial resolution of 0.9 metres in its 400–900 nm panchromatic band, making it the smallest satellite to be put in orbit capable of such high resolution imagery. The multispectral sensor collects data in blue (450–515 nm), green (515–595 nm), red (605–695 nm), and near-infrared (740–900 nm) bands, all at 2 metre resolution.

See also 

 Kepler Communications
 Robotic spacecraft
 Satellogic
 Spacecraft design
 SpaceX
 Spire Global

References

External links 

 
 Planet Labs on NASA TV (10 November 2015).

Companies based in San Francisco
Aerospace companies of the United States
Technology companies established in 2010
2010 establishments in California
Spacecraft manufacturers
Private spaceflight companies

Remote sensing companies
Government procurement in the United States